is the first single from singer and cellist Kanon Wakeshima and An Cafe bassist Kanon's duo group Kanon x Kanon, and Wakeshima's third overall single. The song was used as the second theme song for the anime adaptation of Shiki.

Track listing

Personnel
 Kanon Wakeshima – Vocals, Cello, Piano, Lyrics
 Kanon - Bass, Lyrics, Production

References 

2010 songs
Anime songs
2010 debut singles
Sony Music Entertainment Japan singles